Wayne Charles Doty (born April 12, 1973) is an American double murderer currently on death row for the May 17, 2011 murder of 21-year-old fellow inmate Xavier Rodriguez.

Doty was sentenced to death after he pleaded guilty to killing Xavier Rodriguez, a fellow inmate he stabbed and strangled to death while he was serving a life sentence for the fatal shooting of Harvey Horne II, a night watchman at a Plant City manufacturing plant during a drug robbery on April 20, 1996.

Death sentence
Wayne Doty was first sentenced to death on June 5, 2013; that sentence was upheld by the Florida Supreme Court in July 2013. Once Doty's case went back to the trial court that sentenced him for post-conviction appeals, he initially asked the lower court to dismiss his attorney and waive all his appeals. However, in 2016, the United States Supreme Court in Hurst v. Florida declared Florida's capital sentencing laws unconstitutional. The old law called for a majority vote of the jury to sentence a defendant to death. The new law calls for a unanimous jury vote of death in order to sentence a defendant to death. In 2016 Doty's first death sentence was thrown out. He was retried two years later, and the jury unanimously voted to sentence him to death again on May 15, 2018. Although Florida has yet to set Doty's execution date, Doty is the only inmate on Florida's death row who has chosen the electric chair over lethal injection as the preferred method of execution.

Serialisation
In 2018, the Netflix program I Am a Killer featured Doty in the 10th episode.

See also
 List of death row inmates in the United States

References

1973 births
Living people
1996 murders in the United States
2011 murders in the United States
American male criminals
American people convicted of murder
People convicted of murder by Florida
Prisoners sentenced to death by Florida
People from Pueblo, Colorado